LoopUp is a global provider of cloud communications and collaboration solutions for enterprises. LoopUp’s core product is cloud telephony for Microsoft Teams as an end-to-end managed service. The company also offers a SaaS platform for remote meetings and operator-managed large online meetings.

Co-CEOs Steve Flavell and Michael Hughes founded LoopUp in 2003 in San Francisco and London, where the company is headquartered. Other offices include Barbados, Berlin, Boston, Hong Kong, Madrid, Malmö, and Sydney.

History
LoopUp began in 2003 as Ring2. It was founded by Steve Flavell and Michael Hughes, who met while studying at Stanford University.  As two of eight UK students on their course, they connected and shared ideas, coming up with a concept for a digital communication network for businesses. They teamed up after graduating and founded Ring2 in 2003.

Initially, LoopUp was funded by a group of around 60 angel investors, including friends and former colleagues of the founders, and Adara Venture Partners, a Spanish venture capital company.

In 2007, Ring2 raised a further round of funding to grow the business more rapidly by hiring a sales staff. According to an interview with Flavell, Ring2 hired 25 people following this round of funding. Since then, growth has been driven largely by recruiting graduates that are trained internally.

In September 2007, Ring2 announced the launch of its conference call control service on Windows Mobile 5 and 6-powered devices, expanding its mobile services from BlackBerry platforms to WinMob-powered cellphones and PDAs.

In December 2010, Ring2 was selected by BT to provide conference calling to its customers under the BT MeetMe brand, including BT MeetMe Mobile Controller, BT MeetMe Desktop Controller, and BT MeetMe Add-in for Outlook. In 2012, Ring2 changed its name to LoopUp and added support for remote meetings as well as conference calls.

In March 2013, LoopUp announced a partnership with LIME to distribute it its product as part of a managed service agreement to business customers in 14 countries across the Caribbean. In September 2015, LoopUp opened their sixth office in New York to access the large number of professional services firms headquartered in that city.

In August 2016, LoopUp was floated on the Alternative Investment Market in an IPO that valued the business at £40 million. LoopUp's IPO was the first tech flotation in London after the Brexit referendum in June 2016. Flavell stated in an interview with The Daily Telegraph that the Brexit vote hadn't put them off the idea of an IPO and that it was a necessary step to raise funds to expand the business further. Both Flavell and Hughes retained a stake in LoopUp. Lady Barbara Judge was announced as chair of LoopUp's board following the company's IPO.

Later in 2016, Hughes received an MBE for services to British graduates in Silicon Valley and San Francisco. This was in recognition of his role in founding LoopUp, and also the Silicon Valley Internship Programme, an organisation that arranges internships for British engineering graduates at Silicon Valley-based tech firms.

At the end of 2016, LoopUp’s turnover was £12.8 million, up 39% from 2015, and shares rose 13% in a single day following the performance announcement in early 2017. In May 2018, LoopUp commercially launched into the Australian market with the opening of an office in Sydney.

In June 2018, LoopUp announced it had acquired British-based conferencing company MeetingZone. The deal was a reverse takeover, valued at £61 million.

In September 2021, the company announced the acquisition of SyncRTC, parent company of hybrid collaboration SaaS technology platform mashme.io.

References

2016 initial public offerings
Companies listed on the London Stock Exchange
Software companies based in London
Software companies established in 2003